Esh (majuscule: Ʃ Unicode  U+01A9, minuscule: ʃ Unicode U+0283) is a character used in conjunction with the Latin script, which represents the voiceless postalveolar fricative (English sh).

Form, usage, and history
Its lowercase form ʃ is similar to a long s ſ  or an integral sign ∫; in 1928 the Africa Alphabet borrowed the Greek letter sigma for the uppercase form Ʃ, but more recently the African reference alphabet discontinued it, using the lowercase esh only. The lowercase form was introduced by Isaac Pitman in his 1847 Phonotypic Alphabet to represent the voiceless postalveolar fricative (English sh). It is today used in the alphabets of some African languages, as well as in the International Phonetic Alphabet.

The International Phonetic Alphabet (IPA) uses  to represent a voiceless palato-alveolar sibilant.

 is used in the Teuthonista phonetic transcription system.

Variations of esh are used for other phonetic transcription: ᶋ ᶘ ʃ.

See also

 Long s (the character ſ)
 Sigma (the Greek character σ)
 Sz (digraph)
 Sh (digraph)
 Sch (trigraph)
 Sci (trigraph)
 Sc (digraph)
 Ch (digraph)
 Š
 Ş
 Sha (the Cyrillic letter)
 ഽ (Praslesham)

References

Latin-script letters
Phonetic transcription symbols